George Curran (12 February 1918 – 29 December 1998) was an English professional rugby league footballer who played in the 1940s and 1950s.

Playing career

International honours
George Curran won caps for England while at Salford in 1946 against Wales (2 matches), and France, in 1947 against Wales (2 matches), and France, in 1948 against France (2 matches), and Wales, in 1949 against Wales, and France (2 matches), and won caps for Great Britain while at Salford in 1946 against Australia, and New Zealand, in 1947 against New Zealand, and in 1948–49 against Australia (3 matches).

Championship final appearances
George Curran played  in Dewsbury's 14-25 aggregate defeat by Wigan in the Championship Final during the 1943–44 season; the 9-13 first-leg defeat at Central Park, Wigan on Saturday 13 May 1944, and the 5-12 second-leg defeat at Crown Flatt, Dewsbury on Saturday 20 May 1944.

Challenge Cup Final appearances
George Curran played  in Wigan's 10-0 victory over Barrow in the 1951 Challenge Cup Final during the 1950–51 season at Wembley Stadium, London on Saturday 5 May 1951, and played  in Huddersfield's 15-10 victory over St. Helens in the 1953 Challenge Cup Final during the 1952–53 season at Wembley Stadium, London  on Saturday 25 April 1953, in front of a crowd of 89,588.

County League appearances
George Curran played in Wigan's victory in the Lancashire County League during the 1951–52 season.

County Cup Final appearances
George Curran played  in Huddersfield's 18-8 victory over Batley in the 1952 Yorkshire County Cup Final during the 1952–53 season at Headingley Rugby Stadium, Leeds on Saturday 15 November 1952.

Contemporaneous Article Extract
"Toured Australia and New Zealand in 1946 as a Salford player, but returned to join Wigan. Went to Fartown in December, 1951, and has played a large part in the success of the pack."

References

External links
Statistics at wigan.rlfans.com

1918 births
1998 deaths
Dewsbury Rams players
England national rugby league team players
English rugby league players
Great Britain national rugby league team players
Huddersfield Giants players
Rugby league hookers
Rugby league props
Rugby league second-rows
Salford Red Devils players
Rugby league players from Wigan
St Helens R.F.C. players
Wigan Warriors players